The 1988 NCAA Division I baseball tournament was played at the end of the 1988 NCAA Division I baseball season to determine the national champion of college baseball.  The tournament concluded with eight teams competing in the College World Series, a double-elimination tournament in its forty-second year.  Eight regional competitions were held to determine the participants in the final event.  Each region was composed of six teams, resulting in 48 teams participating in the tournament at the conclusion of their regular season, and in some cases, after a conference tournament.  The forty-second tournament's champion was Stanford coached by Mark Marquess.  The Most Outstanding Player was Lee Plemel of Stanford.

Regionals
The opening rounds of the tournament were played across eight regional sites across the country, each consisting of a six-team field. Each regional tournament is double-elimination, however region brackets are variable depending on the number of teams remaining after each round. In 1988, for the first time, the NCAA seeded all six teams in each regional. The winners of each regional advanced to the College World Series.

Bold indicates winner.

Northeast Regional at New Britain, CT

East Regional at Tallahassee, FL

Atlantic Regional at Coral Gables, FL

Central Regional at Austin, TX

Midwest Regional at Stillwater, OK

South Regional at Starkville, MS

West I Regional at Fresno, CA

West II Regional at Tempe, AZ

College World Series
After 38 seasons as a full double-elimination tournament, the format changed for 1988. Teams were split into two four-team double-elimination brackets, with the winners of each bracket meeting in a one-game championship. This format was used through 2002.

Participants

Results
Of the 15 tournaments in which a single championship game was played, this was the only one where both teams entered the final with a loss.

Bracket

Game results

All-Tournament Team
The following players were members of the All-Tournament Team.

Notable players
 Arizona State: Kevin Higgins, Pat Listach, Blas Minor, Tim Spehr
 Cal State Fullerton: Huck Flener, Brent Mayne
 California: Jeff Kent, Darren Lewis
 Florida: Jamie McAndrew, Herb Perry
 Fresno: Tom Goodwin, Steve Hosey, Erik Schullstrom, Eddie Zosky
 Miami (FL): Joe Grahe, Kurt Knudsen, Oscar Múñoz
 Stanford: Paul Carey, Steve Chitren, Brian Johnson, Brian Keyser, Mike Mussina, Stan Spencer, Ed Sprague, Ron Witmeyer
 Wichita State: Greg Brummett, P. J. Forbes, Dave Haas, Mike Lansing, Pat Meares, Eric Wedge

Tournament notes 

 Arizona State sets a new tournament record scoring 27 runs in their victory over UNLV surpassing the record set by Arizona in the 1986 tournament when they scored 26 runs.

See also
 1988 NCAA Division I softball tournament
 1988 NCAA Division II baseball tournament
 1988 NCAA Division III baseball tournament
 1988 NAIA World Series

References

NCAA Division I Baseball Championship
1988 NCAA Division I baseball season
NCAA Division I baseball
Baseball in Austin, Texas